Stéphane Rugonumugabo is a Burundian professional footballer who plays as a defender for LLB Académic FC in the Burundi Football League.

International career
He was invited by Lofty Naseem, the national team coach, to represent Burundi in the 2014 African Nations Championship held in South Africa.

References

Living people
1990 births
Burundi A' international footballers
2014 African Nations Championship players
Burundian footballers
Association football defenders
LLB Académic FC players